Göçbeyli is a town in Bergama district of İzmir Province, Turkey. The oldest inscription in the settlement is dated 1214 in Hicri Takvim (1799 AD) . But it is believed that the settlement was founded much before this date by a nomadic Turkmen tribe named Sarıkoyunlu which decided to settle. The name of the settlement refers to nomadic era of the tribe (göç means "migrate" and bey means "lord") In 1975, Göçbeyli was declared a seat of township. The town economy depends on agriculture. Industrial plants, fruits and cereals are among the town products.

References

Populated places in İzmir Province
İzmir Province
Towns in Turkey
Bergama District